PhosAgro is a Russian chemical holding company producing fertilizer, phosphates and feed phosphates. The company is based in Moscow, Russia, and its subsidiaries include Apatit, a company based in the Murmansk Region and engaged in the extraction of apatite rock. The company is Europe’s largest producer of phosphate-based fertilisers.

Ownership history

The original owner of Phosagro's assets (most notably Apatit, a Soviet era mining company) is now an exiled Russian billionaire Mikhail Khodorkovsky's via his company, Menatep. In 2003, Khodorkovsky was arrested for tax evasion and fraud and the charges against him were ostensibly connected to Menatep's purchase of shares in Apatit. However, some may have saw the charges as punishment for publicly clashing with Vladimir Putin most understand that Khodorkovsky is no innocent victims and was able to get away with Billions belonging to Russian workers as well as looting the Russian economy through notorious “Loans for Shares” auction scam he helped engineer and take advantage of to acquire valuable companies for pennies on the dollar, among other crimes.  

During Khordorkovsky's trial, the state seized Menatep's stake Apatit. In 2004, Andrey Guryev, who at the time ran Apatit on behalf of Khordorkovsky's Manatep and was also a Russian senator, wrote a message to Khordorkovsky in prison to convince him to sell his remaining 50% stake in Phosagro to Guryev. Khordorkovsky sold his shares to Guryev for a low price.

In July 2011, Phosagro raised $538 million in a London IPO.

In 2012, Phosagro paid $344 million at a state tender to buy back a 26.7% share in Apatit, bringing the company's ownership to 76%.

As of 2012, Andrey Guryev and his family owned 5.47% of Phosagro via various trusts.

PhosAgro is 19.35% owned by Vladimir Litvinenko, who oversaw Vladimir Putin's plagiarized doctoral thesis in 1996.

Subsidiaries
 Apatit
 Ammophos
 Cherepovetsky Azot
 BMU (Balakovskyie Mineralnyie Udobrenia)
 PhosAgro-Trans     it is planned to rename all these companies with the names of the owners

Carbon footprint
PhosAgro reported Total CO2e emissions (Direct + Indirect) for 31 December 2020 at 5,961 Kt (+113/+1.9% y-o-y). There is little evidence of a consistent declining trend as yet.

United Kingdom controversy

In June 2017, Igor Sychev, a former head of tax department of Phosagro, presented a claim against Phosagro to the London High Court of Justice. In his claim he demanded 1% of the company’s shares or their value in cash (approximately $55 million, and also $8 million in cash to serve as his remuneration for having previously defended PhosAgro interests in court).

According to Sychev's statement, the conflict started after he didn't receive the agreed remuneration for defending Phosagro's interests in court.

The defendants in the London court case are Andrey Guryev, PhosAgro's Vice president of the Board of directors, and another member of the board Igor Antoshin, together with some offshore companies based in Seychelles and Belize. A London judge has given permission to open proceedings against the defendants.

In October 2019, another lawsuit was launched against Phosagro in the London High Court. Alexander Gorbachev, a Russian businessman and former senior executive at Phosagro, is suing the company for what he alleges is his rightful share of the business, a stake that is worth £1 billion at today’s market value. The full trial will be heard in the High Court in 2020-2021.

References

External links
 
 
 
 
 
 Website of Igor Sychev

Manufacturing companies based in Moscow
Companies established in 2003
Russian brands
Fertilizer companies of Russia
Yukos
Companies listed on the Moscow Exchange